Memories with Food at Gipsy House is a collection of anecdotes and recipes by Roald Dahl and his second wife, Felicity, first published in 1991.

The book was reissued in softcover in 1996 under the title Roald Dahl's Cookbook.

Editions
  (First Edition, 1991)

References

1991 non-fiction books
Books by Roald Dahl
Cookbooks
Books about food and drink
Viking Press books